Michael Anderson (born June 8, 1965) is an American baseball coach and former outfielder, who is the current head baseball coach of the Northern Colorado Bears. He played college baseball at Northern Colorado from 1983 to 1986. He played in Minor League Baseball (MiLB) for 4 seasons from 1986 to 1989. He served as the head coach of the Nebraska Cornhuskers (2003–2011).

In his first five seasons as the head coach, he compiled a 214–100 record. His greatest success came in 2005, when he guided Nebraska to a 57–15 record, while also taking the school to its first-ever College World Series win. The team finished with a school record national ranking of 5th, and it set a school record for highest national seed in the NCAA Division I Baseball Championship tournament (3rd). Anderson won Big 12 coach of the Year honors in 2003 and 2005, and in both seasons his team won the Big 12 conference title. The 2003 Big 12 championship made Anderson only the second Nebraska baseball coach since 1929 to win a conference title in his first season. In 2006, his team earned only the school's third-ever national seed (6th). He previously had served as an assistant with Nebraska from 1995 to 2002, a period when the school's baseball program began having success, most notably being the Huskers' first College World Series appearances in 2001 and 2002

Coaching career

On May 22, 2011, Anderson was fired by Nebraska Athletic Director Tom Osborne.

On July 2, 2013, after a brief stint coaching Regis Jesuit High School in Aurora, Colorado, Anderson accepted an assistant coaching job for the Oklahoma Sooners to join Pete Hughes as hitting coach.

On June 23, 2022, Anderson was named the head coach at Northern Colorado.

Head coaching record

References

External links

Husker Biographies

1965 births
Living people
Nebraska Cornhuskers baseball coaches
Northern Colorado Bears baseball coaches
High school baseball coaches in the United States
Oklahoma Sooners baseball coaches
Palm Springs Angels players
Northern Colorado Bears baseball players
Baseball coaches from Colorado
People from Brighton, Colorado